Aurora is the second album of post-rock band Esmerine.  It was released by Madrona Records in 2005.

Track listing
 "Quelques Mots Pleins d'Ombre" – 7:22
 "Histories Repeating as One Thousand Hearts Mend" – 16:47
 "Mados" – 2:34
 "Why She Swallows Bullets and Stones" – 5:21
 "Ebb Tide, Spring Tide, Neap Tide, Flood" – 3:48
 "Le Rire de l'Ange" – 4:21

References

2005 albums
Esmerine albums